Clivina addita is a species of ground beetle in the subfamily Scaritinae. It was described by Darlington in 1934.

References

addita
Beetles described in 1934